Daniel Horner is an American sport shooter and firearms instructor who placed fourth in the Production division at the 2008 IPSC Handgun World Shoot. He shoots varied action shooting competitions with an emphasis on multigun, and is a 10-time USPSA Multigun Champion in the Tactical division (2007, 2009, 2010, 2011, 2012, 2014, 2015, 2016, 2017 and 2018). Horner competed for the U.S. Army Marksmanship Unit from 2005 to 2018, when he joined Team SIG Sauer.

Merits
 10-time USPSA Multigun Champion
4-time 3-Gun Nation Pro Series Champion
2014 NRA World Shooting Champion (event sponsored by Trijicon, dubbed the 'Trijicon World Shooting Championship')
4th place overall in the Production division at the 2008 IPSC Handgun World Shoot
 6th place in Open division at the 2009 IPSC European Rifle Championship
 IPSC Shotgun National Champion
 2-time IDPA U.S. Champion
 1st Place Team 2014 USASOC International Sniper Competition (with partner Tyler Payne)
 1st Place Team 2012 International Sniper Competition (with partner Tyler Payne)
 4-time Winner of Mammoth Sniper Competition (2012-2015, 3 times with Tyler Payne, 1 time with Candice Horner)

See also 
 Jerry Miculek, Professional shooter
 Max Michel, Professional shooter
 Josh Froelich, American sport shooter

References

Living people
IPSC shooters
American male sport shooters
1987 births